Albi Koldashi (born 6 July 1997) is an Albanian professional footballer who plays as a midfielder for Albanian club KF Vora.

Club career

Kukësi 
Koldashi made his Albanian Superliga debut on 11 March 2017 in a 4–0 home victory over KF Korabi Peshkopi. He was subbed on for Matija Dvorneković in the 80th minute.

International career 
Koldashi received his first international call up at the Albania national under-21 football team by coach Alban Bushi for a gathering between 14 and 17 May 2017 with most of the players selected from Albanian championships.

Career statistics

Club

References

External links 
 
 Albi Koldashi profile FSHF.org

1997 births
Living people
Footballers from Tirana
Albanian footballers
Association football midfielders
Albania youth international footballers
Albania under-21 international footballers
FK Kukësi players
Besa Kavajë players
KF Elbasani players
KS Turbina Cërrik players
FK Kukësi B players
Kategoria Superiore players
Kategoria e Parë players
Kategoria e Dytë players